WBOJ (1270 AM) is a radio station licensed to Columbus, Georgia, serving the Columbus area.  The station is currently owned by PMB Broadcasting.

History
The station started broadcasting October 4, 1947, on 620 kHz at 1 kW daytime only with the call letters WGBA. In the beginning, it simulcast programming of WGBA-FM, which began broadcasting in December 1946.

It was the third station in Columbus. By 1950, the station had moved up the dial to 1460 kHz, with 1 kW full-time, displacing station WSAC. The license for 620 was turned back to the FCC. That frequency eventually wound up being used in La Grange, Georgia. By 1954, WGBA was on 1270 kc. with 1 kW daytime only. The 1460 frequency was reassigned to Phenix City, Alabama with the call letters WPNX. About 1970, the call letters were changed to WHYD, with a full-time country format.

The station was assigned the call letters WTMQ on March 28, 1994. In March 1997, WTMQ was purchased by M&M Partners Inc. and flipped from Spanish-language programming to a Gospel music format. On June 20, 1997, the station changed its call sign to WMLF.

In May 2003, the station changed formats from sports talk "The Sports Monster" to Southern Gospel music. On February 27, 2004. the call letters were changed to WSHE.

On January 15, 2014, WSHE went silent and then returned to the air on July 25, 2014, with a sports format with programming from Fox Sports Radio. The call letters were changed to WZCG on March 2, 2015, and then to WBOJ on July 1, 2015.

On April 26, 2016, WBOJ changed their format from sports to classic country as "Kissin' Country Legends", branded as an offshoot of WKCN, and utilizing a simulcast on 102.5 W273CW.

On August 12, 2016, WBOJ changed their format from classic country to classic hits, branded as "Boomer 102.5" (swapping formats with WRLD 95.3 FM Valley, Alabama).

Previous logo

References

External links

BOJ
Classic hits radio stations in the United States
Radio stations established in 1947
1947 establishments in Georgia (U.S. state)